The 2013–14 season is the 18th edition of Europe's premier basketball tournament for women – EuroLeague Women since it was rebranded to its current format.

Pots
Defending champions UMMC Ekaterinburg, 2013 Runners-up Fenerbahçe and EuroLeague Women four-time winners Sparta&K M. R. Vidnoje have been given top seeds status. The teams are divided into two groups of 7 teams and one group of 6 teams.

Regular season
The draw took place on 5 July 2013 in Munich, Germany. The teams were divided in two groups of seven and one group of six teams. 14 teams will progress to contest the playoffs while the organiser of the Final Eight will qualify automatically to the season ending tournament.

Group A

Group B

Group C

Round 2
Game 1 were played on 11 March 2014. Game 2 were played on 14 March 2014. Game 3 will be played on 19 March 2014. The team that won two games first, advanced to the quarterfinals. UMMC Ekaterinburg qualified directly to the quarterfinals as hoster of the Final Eight.

Final eight
The Final Eight was held in Yekaterinburg.

Quarter-final round
The Quarter-Final Round was played in a round robin system with two groups of four teams. The two group winners advanced to the Semi-Final Round.

Group A

Group B

Semi-final round

Semifinal 1

Semifinal 2

Third-place

Final

Stats leaders in regular season

Points

Rebounds

Assists

See also 
2013–14 EuroCup Women

References

External links
 Official website

    
EuroLeague Women seasons